Omega Diatribe is a Hungarian groove metal band from Budapest.

History 
Omega Diatribe was formed in 2008 by Gergõ Hájer (guitar) and Ákos Szathmáry (bass). They started to play live in 2012 with a five-piece lineup. The band grew in popularity with their intense life shows and powerful sound.

In 2013, Omega Diatribe released their full-length debut album entitled IAPETUS. IAPETUS contains ten songs. The band recorded the CD at their own studio at 515 Studio. The album was nominated the 'Best Album of the Year' and 'Best Studio Production' in Hungary, and landed in second place.

In 2014, the band split ways with Dávid Metzger (drummer) and started to work with American drummer Kevin Talley on new material. Omega Diatribe released their new EP called Abstract Ritual on 26 February 2015.

In the summer of 2015, they signed to the US-based record label Independent Ear Records. Thanks to this, Omega Diatribe's record Abstract Ritual was released in the US on 11 September 2015, including a remixed bonus track by Hungarian electro artist dOTS.

The band released a new single in the beginning of 2016 called "Contrist". The release also contains an exclusive cover of Slipknot's anthem. By 2016, the band was mostly playing abroad and at festivals such as Euroblast with hopes of playing for their fans at even more locations.

Omega Diatribe released their third studio record called Trinity in 2018, which was co-produced, mixed and mastered by Danish producer Tue Madsen at Antfarm Studios. Trinity was released under the Ukrainian record label Metal Scrap Records.
After an intense tour season, the band has won the 'Best Live Band' and 'Best Album of the Year' awards at Hungarian Metal Awards in 2018.

In 2020, they released their fourth studio record Metanoia under the wings of Metal Scrap Records, which was mastered by Swedish producer Jens Bogren at Fascination Street Studios.

Members 
 Gergely Komáromi – vocals (2011–present)
 Ákos Szathmáry – bass (2008–present)
 Gergő Hájer – guitar (2008–present)
 Attila Császár – guitar (2010–present)
 Tommy Kiss – drums (2015–present)
 Dávid Metzger – drums (2010–2014)
 Jeromos Nagy – drums (2008–2010)

Timeline

Discography 

Albums
 2012: Forty Minutes (demo)
 2013: IAPETUS (album)
 2014: Hydrozoan Periods (single)
 2015: Abstract Ritual (EP)
 2016: Contrist (single)
 2018: Trinity (album)
 2020: Metanoia (album)

Music videos
"Unshadowed Days" (2014)
"Contrist" (2016)
"Hydrozoan Periods" (2016)
"Divine of Nature" (2018)
"Souls Collide" (2018)
"Chain Reaction" (2018)
"Trinity" (2019)
"Baby's Got a Temper" (The Prodigy cover) (2019)
"Parallel" (2020)
"Mirror Neuron" (2020)

References 

 La Bam Prod. 
 Independent Ear Records 
 HammerWorld.hu 
 Nowmagazin.hu
 Zenevilag.net
 Shockmagazin.hu
 Passzio.hu
 Rockbook.hu
 Femforgacs.hu
 Hamemrworld.hu
 Rockstation.blog.hu
 Zeneszoveg.hu
 viharock.hu
 Femvar.hu
 Geargods.net
 Bravewords.com
 Metalunderground.com
 Rockvilag.hu
 Kronosmortus.com
 Shortscore.net
 Zsigapal.hu
 Ventsmagazine.com
 Metalkilincs.hu
 Saladaysmag.com
 Port.hu
 Rockelet.hu
 Spirit-of-metal.com
 Labamstudio.fr
 Nowmagazine.hu
 Zenevilag.net
 Underview.hu
 Blackbirdmusicblog.blogspot.hu
 Heavymetal.hu
 Funzine.hu
 Numberonemusic.com
 Rockstation.blog.hu
 Passzio.hu
 Rockvilag.hu
 Shockmagazine.hu
 Rockbook.hu
 Itdjents.com
 Bravewords.com

Hungarian heavy metal musical groups
Groove metal musical groups
Musical groups established in 2012
2012 establishments in Hungary